Symphony No. 11 is a composition by the Brazilian composer Heitor Villa-Lobos, written in 1955. A performance lasts about twenty-five minutes.

History
On 29 October 1954, along with a number of other prominent composers, Villa-Lobos was commissioned jointly by the Koussevitzky Music Foundation in the Library of Congress and the Boston Symphony Orchestra for a work to celebrate that orchestra's 75th anniversary. In response, he composed his Eleventh Symphony, which was completed in 1955. The autograph manuscript of the score, held by the Library of Congress, Washington, DC, is dedicated to Serge and Natalie Koussevitzky.  The symphony was first performed in Symphony Hall, Boston, on 2 March 1956 by the Boston Symphony Orchestra, conducted by the composer. The performance was warmly received in the press.

Instrumentation
The symphony is scored for an orchestra consisting of 2 piccolos, 2 flutes, 2 oboes, cor anglais, 2 clarinets, bass clarinet, 2 bassoons, contrabassoon, 4 horns, 4 trumpets, 4 trombones, tuba, tímpani, tam-tam, cymbals, triangle, matraca (a wooden rattle), bass drum, marimba, xylophone, celesta, vibraphone, 2 harps, piano, and strings.

Analysis
The symphony is in four movements:
 Allegro Moderato 
 Largo 
 Scherzo (Molto vivace) 
 Molto Allegro

References

Cited sources
 
 .

Further reading
 Durgin, Cyrus. 1956. "Boston Symphony Orchestra: Villa-Lobos' Symphony No. 11". Daily Boston Globe (3 March): 20.
 Enyart, John William. 1984. "The Symphonies of Heitor Villa-Lobos". PhD diss. Cincinnati: University of Cincinnati.
 Peppercorn, Lisa M. 1991. Villa-Lobos: The Music: An Analysis of His Style, translated by Stefan de Haan. London: Kahn & Averill; White Plains, NY: Pro/Am Music Resources Inc.  (Kahn & Averill); .
 Salles, Paulo de Tarso. 2009. Villa-Lobos: processos composicionais. Campinas, SP: Editora da Unicamp. 

Symphonies by Heitor Villa-Lobos
1955 compositions
Music with dedications
Music commissioned by the Boston Symphony Orchestra